James Sinclair Tait (March 4, 1849 – July 5, 1928) was a physician, author and political figure in Newfoundland. He represented Burin in the Newfoundland and Labrador House of Assembly from 1889 to as a Liberal.

Tait was born in Wallace, Nova Scotia, the son of James Tait and Catherine Sinclair, and was educated in Wallace, Amherst and at the Mount Allison Wesleyan College. He received a teaching certificate from the normal school in Truro and taught school in Brigus. He studied medicine with a doctor in Brigus and went on to receive a M.D. from the University of Pennsylvania.

In 1882, Tait married Sarah Elizabeth Calkin. After practising in Brigus for several years, He continued his medical studies at the Royal College of Physicians in London and the Royal College of Surgeons of Edinburgh. He was reelected in 1893 but his election was overturned in 1894 after an appeal was launched by the Conservatives. He ran unsuccessfully for reelection in 1897.  From 1894 to 1909 he served as secretary and registrar for the Newfoundland Medical Board, and as a member of the St. John's Board of Health from 1904 to 1909.

Tait also served as medical superintendent and resident physician at the Hospital for the Insane in Waterford. In 1896, he became a fellow of the Royal College of Surgeons. During his time as superintendent and resident physician, it was discovered that he had unprofessional misconduct allegations made against him with the St. John's Medical Society and was turned out but the Liberal Government refused to remove him from the position.  He was a member of the municipal council for St. John's from 1916 to 1920. Tait died in St. John's at the age of 79.

He contributed medical articles and poetry to various local periodicals and published a pamphlet Tuberculois in 1916. His ballad "Allan Lee" appeared in Songs of Newfoundland published in 1917.

References 

O'Brien, Patricia (1989). "Out of Mind, Out of Sight"

Members of the Newfoundland and Labrador House of Assembly
1849 births
1928 deaths
Newfoundland Colony people